Games played (GP) is a statistic used in team sports to indicate the total number of games in which a player has participated (in any capacity); the statistic is generally applied irrespective of whatever portion of the game is contested.

Baseball
In baseball, the statistic applies to players, who prior to a game, are included on a starting lineup card or are announced as an ex ante substitute, whether or not they play. For pitchers only, the statistic games pitched is used.

A notable example of the application of the above rule is pitcher Larry Yount, who suffered an injury while throwing warmup pitches after being summoned as a reliever in a Major League Baseball (MLB) game on September 15, 1971. He did not face a batter, but was credited with an appearance because he had been announced as a substitute. Yount never appeared in (or actually played in) any other MLB game.

Association football
In association football, a game played is counted if a player is in the Starting XI, or if they come off the bench before full-time.

See also
Major League Baseball consecutive games played streaks
List of NHL players with 500 consecutive games played

References

Baseball statistics